The Battle of Carrizal occurred on June 21, 1916. It was a major skirmish between United States Army troops of General John J. Pershing's Punitive Expedition and Carrancista troops fought at the town of Carrizal in the Mexican state of Chihuahua.

Battle
In June 1916, Gen. Pershing was informed that Pancho Villa could be taken at Carrizal, west of Ahumada. When he sent Captains Boyd and Morey to investigate with C and K troops of the 10th Cavalry, they were confronted by Mexican Army troops, not Villa's men. The Mexican army was ordered by Venustiano Carranza to fire upon any American soldier moving any direction but north. The Americans were issued a warning by the Mexican army.   Boyd ordered the men to attack anyway. In the resulting battle, the American attack was repelled.

By legend Villa supposedly watched with delight as his two enemies fought it out with each other. However, this story is of doubtful veracity as Villa was badly injured at the time and being pursued by both the American Army and the federal Carrancistas. The cavalry's two officers (Charles T. Boyd and Henry R. Adair) and 10 other men were killed and 24 taken prisoner. The Mexican forces lost from 20 to 50 soldiers, including the commanding officer, Gen. Félix Uresti Gómez. General Pershing was furious at this result and asked for permission to attack the Carrancista garrison at Chihuahua. President Wilson, fearing that such an attack would provoke a full-scale war with Mexico, refused. The Battle of Carrizal marked the effective end of the Mexican Expedition. Pancho Villa survived, and small raids on American soil occurred while the expedition was in Mexico. The simultaneous deterioration of German-American relations while World War I raged made any escalation in Mexico undesirable and so negotiations followed.

Legacy
Lt. Henry Rodney Adair was killed in this battle. During World War II Camp Adair was established in the Willamette Valley, Oregon, as an Army training facility in honor of his service.
The Battle of Carrizal figured prominently in the plot of the 1917 race movie, A Trooper of Troop K

See also
United States involvement in the Mexican Revolution
Mexico in World War I

References
Notes

Bibliography
Braddy, Haldeen (1957). "Pancho Villa: Fact, Fiction, or Folklore." Journal of American Folklore 70 (1957).
Calhoun, Frederick (1986). Power and Principle: Armed Intervention in Wilsonian Foreign Policy. Kent, Ohio: Kent State University Press.
Eisenhower, John (1993). Intervention!: The United States and the Mexican Revolution, 1913-1917. New York: Norton.
Mason, Herbert M (1970). The Great Pursuit. New York: Random House.
Salinas Carranza, Alberto (1937) La Expedicion Punitiva. Mexico, DF: Ediciones Botas.
(1916) "Seek Only Nation's Peace." The New York Times June 23.
Sweeney, William (1919). History of the American Negro in the Great War. Chicago: Sapp.

Carrizal
Carrizal
Carrizal
1916 in Mexico
Carrizal
June 1916 events